Lalage is a genus of passerine birds belonging to the cuckooshrike family Campephagidae, many of which are commonly known as trillers. There are about 18 species which occur in southern Asia and Australasia with a number of species on Pacific islands. They feed mainly on insects and fruit. They build a neat cup-shaped nest high in a tree.

They are fairly small birds, about 15 to 20 cm long. They are mainly black, grey and white in colour.

Most species are fairly common but the Samoan triller is considered to be near threatened and the Norfolk Island subspecies of the long-tailed triller has become extinct.

Taxonomy and systematics

Extant species
The genus now includes six species that were formerly assigned to the genus Coracina. A molecular phylogenetic study published in 2010 found that the species form part of the clade that contain members of the genus Lalage.

The genus contains 20 species:
 Black-and-white triller, Lalage melanoleuca
 Pied triller, Lalage nigra
 White-rumped triller, Lalage leucopygialis
 White-shouldered triller, Lalage sueurii
 White-winged triller, Lalage tricolor
 Rufous-bellied triller, Lalage aurea
 White-browed triller, Lalage moesta
 Black-browed triller, Lalage atrovirens
Biak triller, Lalage leucoptera
 Varied triller, Lalage leucomela
 Mussau triller, Lalage conjuncta
 Polynesian triller, Lalage maculosa
 Samoan triller, Lalage sharpei
 Long-tailed triller, Lalage leucopyga
 Norfolk triller, Lalage leucopyga leucopyga
 Black-winged cuckooshrike, Lalage melaschistos
 Black-headed cuckooshrike, Lalage melanoptera
 Indochinese cuckooshrike, Lalage polioptera
 Lesser cuckooshrike, Lalage fimbriata
 Mauritius cuckooshrike, Lalage typica
 Reunion cuckooshrike, Lalage newtoni

Former species
Formerly, some authorities also considered the following species (or subspecies) as species within the genus Lalage:
 Buff-bellied monarch (as L. banksiana)
 Black-throated shrikebill (as L. nigrogularis)

References

Perrins, Christopher, ed. (2004) The New Encyclopedia of Birds, Oxford University Press, Oxford.

 
Bird genera